Kaghazkonan-e Markazi Rural District is in Kaghazkonan District of Mianeh County, East Azerbaijan province, Iran. At the National Census of 2006, its population was 2,186 in 641 households. There were 1,930 inhabitants in 639 households at the following census of 2011. At the most recent census of 2016, the population of the rural district was 2,038 in 720 households. The largest of its 27 villages was Astanjin, with 255 people.

References 

Meyaneh County

Rural Districts of East Azerbaijan Province

Populated places in East Azerbaijan Province

Populated places in Meyaneh County